Anthony Charles Thiselton  (1937 – 7 February 2023) was an English Anglican priest, theologian, and academic. He wrote a number of books and articles on a range of topics in Christian theology, biblical studies, and the philosophy of religion. He served on the Human Fertilisation and Embryology Authority, appointed by the Minister of Health.

Biography
Thiselton was educated at City of London School, with degrees from King's College London (BD, MTh) the University of Sheffield (PhD) and the University of Durham (DD). He received an honorary doctorate from the University of Chester; in March 2012. Thiselton was an Honorary Fellow of Cranmer Hall, Durham; fellow of King's College London and fellow of the British Academy.

Thiselton was head of theology at the University of Nottingham and was also principal of both St John's College, Nottingham (1986 to 1988) and St John's College, Durham (1988 to 1992). He was a priest and canon in the Church of England, in which he represented the Diocese of Southwell on the church's General Synod. He was an associate priest in the parish of St Mary the Virgin, Attenborough, Nottingham. On 25 June 2002, he was presented with a Lambeth Degree of Doctorate of Divinity by the then Archbishop of Canterbury, George Carey.

Thiselton was visiting Professor at Fuller Theological Seminary, Pasadena; Calvin College, Grand Rapids; Regent College, Vancouver; North Park, Seminary, Chicago; the University of Utrecht, Netherlands; several seminaries in South Korea; Senior Lecturer in the University of Sheffield; and Professor of Theology in the University of Chester. Thiselton retired from Nottingham in 2001; then served as Professor of Christian Theology at the University of Chester from 2001 to 2006. He returned to Nottingham as professor, from 2006, and his retirement in 2011 marked his final retirement from academic posts.

Thiselton served on the Church of England General Synod membership, and its Commissions and Committees: Crown Nominations Commission, (2000-2010); Appointments Committee (2008–13); and Theological Education and Training Committee (1999-2005). Outside Synod he remained on the Doctrine Commission for nearly 30 years: Church of England Doctrine Commission (1976-2006); Acting Chairman (1987); Church of England Faith and Order Group (1979–89); and Theological Education in the Anglican Communion (2003–06).

His main published work was in the areas of hermeneutics (especially hermeneutical theory and its relationship to biblical interpretation), Christian doctrine (including eschatology and pneumatology), and biblical studies, in particular with two substantial commentaries on 1 Corinthians. He is unusual in academic theology for publishing research-level works across such a broad range of topics.

Thiselton received a Festschrift, edited by Stanley Porter and Matthew Malcolm, entitled Horizons in Hermeneutics (Eerdmans) in April 2013. In June 2012 he was also the subject of a one-day conference in his honour, at the University of Nottingham, at which he presented a response paper to several contributors who spoke in light of his work. Proceedings from this conference were published by Paternoster (in the UK) and IVP (in the US) as The Future of Biblical Interpretation (2013). St John's College, Nottingham, inaugurated a series of "Thiselton lectures" in 2013 to honour his work in hermeneutics. He gave the first of these himself, in June 2013.

Thiselton died on 7 February 2023, at the age of 85.

Views
Thiselton was described in 2002, during the selection of the next Archbishop of Canterbury, as belonging to the conservative evangelical wing of the Church of England.  However, it is far from clear Thiselton would be happy with that description and we note the comment of Stanley E. Porter (President, McMaster Divinity College) on the back of Thiselton's "Puzzling Passages in Paul" which reads "This is an exhilarating and infuriating book by Tony Thiselton.  It is exhilarating because he does not shy away from many of the most troubling passages in the Apostle Paul's letter, but infuriating because Thiselton cannot easily or predictably be put in a box regarding his conclusions."

Works

Books

 - forthcoming 4 July 2016

Articles and chapters

Bibliography

References

External links

1937 births
2023 deaths
People educated at the City of London School
Alumni of King's College London
Academics of the University of Nottingham
Academics of the University of Chester
Anglican philosophers
Philosophers of religion
Religious studies scholars
English Anglican theologians
Hermeneutists
Principals of St John's College, Durham
Fellows of the British Academy
Staff of St John's College, Nottingham
Fellows of King's College London
Evangelical Anglican clergy